Sizzle is a 1981 American made-for-television drama film starring Loni Anderson, Leslie Uggams and Roy Thinnes.

Plot
During Prohibition, a woman avenges her boyfriend's murder.

Cast
Loni Anderson as Julie Davis
Leslie Uggams as Vonda
Roy Thinnes as Wheeler
Richard Lynch as Johnny O'Brien
Michael Goodwin as Danny Clark
Phyllis Davis as Sally
Michael V. Gazzo as Tripoli
John Forsythe as Mike Callahan
Richard Bright as Corky
Martine Bartlett as Freda
Robert Costanzo as Al Capone
Arnie Moore as Boggs

Production
Loni Anderson says she based her performance on her grandmother. She says producer Aaron Spelling had the script for a while but was unable to find a star; he cast Anderson after seeing her play a dual role on The Love Boat.

Reception
The Los Angeles Times called it "turgid".

References

External links
Sizzle at TCMDB
Sizzle at BFI
Sizzle at IMDb

1981 television films
1981 films
1981 drama films
Films about prohibition in the United States
Films about Al Capone
Films directed by Don Medford
American drama television films
1980s American films